Connexxus Women's Center/Centro de Mujeres was a non-profit community organization established in January 1985 in West Hollywood, California. The organization was co-founded by Adel Martinez and Lauren Jardine in 1984 as a women-run center in Los Angeles, and provided services that catered to women, particularly lesbians and a space in which lesbians could thrive professionally, personally, and socially. In January 1988, it opened an additional facility in East Los Angeles named Connexxus East/Centro de Mujeres made for outreach to the Latina and Chicana communities. The new facility provided services primarily to lesbians in Los Angeles County, and facilitated information about and access to various human service agencies. It also provided counseling in developing and operating small businesses. The facility also sponsored and hosted cultural and educational activities. The 1,400 square-foot center contained space for a library, workshops, rap groups, counseling meetings, and social activities.

History
Connexxus ran from May 1984 to June 1990. When it was open, the organization was led by members of the lesbian community, such as Jeanne Córdova, Jodi Curlee, Judy Doyle,  Lauren Jardine, Bunny MacCulloch, Del Martinez, June Mazer, Yolanda Retter, and Jane Wagner. In order to sustain the organization the board raised over $20,000 for its operations. It received grants from the National Endowment for the Arts, the California Arts Council, Colling Higgins Foundation, and the Liberty Hill Foundation.

The Connexxus Women's Center/Centro de Mujeres was officially dissolved in 1991. In a letter to the community on January 18, 1990, they shared that as Connexxus expanded and their work surpassed their intended goals, more human service organizations followed their lead and expanded their services too. Due to the increasing number of specialized groups, services, and businesses, fewer lesbians accessed the center's services. Due to this fall in numbers and an imminent financial crisis, Connexxus closed its doors on June 30, 1990.

Programs

Economic Empowerment
In May 1998, the then-President of the United States, Bill Clinton, issued Executive Order 13087, banning discrimination in federal civilian employment on the basis of sexual orientation. Six years earlier in 1992, governor Pete Wilson signed AB 2601, which outlawed employment discrimination against gays and lesbians in California (he vetoed a similar bill, AB 101, the year before).

June Mazer Collection
June Mazer and her partner Bunny MacCulloch started the West Coast Lesbian Collections in their home. The collection, a “Lesbian Herstory Collection”, contained archives about notable lesbian women, organizations like the Daughters of Bilitis, media materials such as the Lesbian Love Records (a radio show targeted towards the lesbian community), information on lesbian events, publications, organizations, and lesbian spaces in the San Francisco Bay Area and Los Angeles County. It was later moved to Connexxus Women's Center as the June Mazer Collection.

After Connexxus dissolved, the collection traveled to various repositories until it was given a permanent home in the Werle Building, a property owned by the City of West Hollywood at 626 N. Robertson Boulevard. The collection was rebranded as the June L. Mazer Lesbian Archives. Through an equitable partnership with the UCLA Library Special Collections, the Mazer Archives retained rights to its collection while increasing public access through digitization.

The Alliance (Connexxus Business & Professional Women's Alliance)
Beginning January 1985, Connexxus published a newsletter by its Connexxus Business & Professional Women's Alliance. The newsletter ceased publication in June 1990.

Community events
Because the Center was intended to be a community space, as well as social-based fundraisers, Connexxus hosted a variety of events. It hosted economic empowerment workshops to support women's skill development. Social groups based on identities, such as black lesbians, singles, Latinas, and mixers were common. The most popular one was All Around Town in 1988, which doubled as a fundraiser. Another popular event was a gallery show of long-time support Laura Aguilar, a Chicana lesbian photographer, called the Chicana Lesbians Series.

References

External links
  Connexxus/Centro de Mujeres Collection, 1985–1991 at UCLA Library Digital Collections

1985 establishments in California
1991 disestablishments in California
1985 in LGBT history
Organizations established in 1985
Women's culture
Community centers in California
Feminism in California
Lesbian culture in California
LGBT in California
Lesbian history in the United States
Defunct LGBT organizations in the United States
Defunct non-profit organizations based in the United States